Quigless Clinic, also known as Quigless Clinic-Hospital, is a historic hospital building located at Tarboro, Edgecombe County, North Carolina. It was built in 1946, to serve the African-American population of Tarboro.  It is a two-story, rectangular brick building with large glass block windows.

It was listed on the National Register of Historic Places in 2000.

References

African-American history of North Carolina
Hospital buildings on the National Register of Historic Places in North Carolina
Buildings and structures completed in 1946
Buildings and structures in Edgecombe County, North Carolina
National Register of Historic Places in Edgecombe County, North Carolina